Kallivayal is a village in the Pattukkottai taluk of Thanjavur district, Tamil Nadu, India.

Demographics 

As per the 2001 census, Kallivayal had a total population of 677 with 344 males and 333 females. The sex ratio was 968. The literacy rate was 62.37.

References 

 

Villages in Thanjavur district